White is a city in Brookings County, South Dakota, United States. The population was 537 at the 2020 census.

History
White was laid out in 1884, and named in honor of W. H. White, a first settler.

Geography
White is located at  (44.434353, -96.647514).

White has been assigned the ZIP code 57276 and the FIPS place code 70940.

Demographics

2010 census
As of the census of 2010, there were 485 people, 195 households, and 121 families residing in the city. The racial makeup of the city was 98.4% White, 0.8% Asian, and 0.8% from two or more races. Hispanic or Latino of any race were 0.4% of the population.

There were 195 households, of which 28.7% had children under the age of 18 living with them, 49.7% were married couples living together, 8.7% had a female householder with no husband present, 3.6% had a male householder with no wife present, and 37.9% were non-families. 34.4% of all households were made up of individuals, and 9.8% had someone living alone who was 65 years of age or older. The average household size was 2.31 and the average family size was 2.98.

The median age in the city was 41.7 years. 23.7% of residents were under the age of 18; 7.5% were between the ages of 18 and 24; 23.3% were from 25 to 44; 24.7% were from 45 to 64; and 20.8% were 65 years of age or older. The gender makeup of the city was 50.1% male and 49.9% female.

2000 census
As of the census of 2000, there were 530 people, 198 households, and 136 families residing in the city. The population density was 741.5 people per square mile (288.2/km2). There were 212 housing units at an average density of 296.6 per square mile (115.3/km2). The racial makeup of the city was 98.30% White, 0.19% African American, 0.75% Native American, and 0.75% from two or more races. Hispanic or Latino of any race were 1.32% of the population.

There were 198 households, out of which 35.4% had children under the age of 18 living with them, 56.6% were married couples living together, 8.6% had a female householder with no husband present, and 31.3% were non-families. 27.3% of all households were made up of individuals, and 14.6% had someone living alone who was 65 years of age or older. The average household size was 2.54 and the average family size was 3.02.

In the city, the population was spread out, with 27.0% under the age of 18, 9.6% from 18 to 24, 28.1% from 25 to 44, 16.0% from 45 to 64, and 19.2% who were 65 years of age or older. The median age was 34 years. For every 100 females, there were 85.3 males. For every 100 females age 18 and over, there were 88.8 males.

The median income for a household in the city was $31,528, and the median income for a family was $40,547. Males had a median income of $26,875 versus $18,750 for females. The per capita income for the city was $13,027. About 4.3% of families and 6.3% of the population were below the poverty line, including 11.0% of those under age 18 and 7.5% of those age 65 or over.

Notable person
 William L. McKnight, businessman and philanthropist.

References

External links
 City website

Cities in Brookings County, South Dakota
Cities in South Dakota
1884 establishments in Dakota Territory